Cesare Airaghi was an Italian colonel and war hero who participated in several conflicts during the 19th-century. Airaghi participated at the Second Italian War of Independence, the Third Italian War of Independence and the First Italo-Ethiopian War before being killed at the Battle of Adwa.

Early years
Cesare was born on October 4, 1840, as the son of Giovanni Battista and Marietta Lattuada at Milan. When he was 14, his father was killed and Cesare was forced to be responsible for his family's finance. While attending the University of Pavia, Airaghi enlisted in the 9th Infantry Regiment and participating at the Second Italian War of Independence. He was appointed as Second Lieutenant of the 17th Infantry Division and fought at the Battle of Palestro. After the war, Airaghi resumed his studies at the University of Pavia and eventually graduated as an engineer.

Military career
Airaghi was promoted to Lieutenant on June 17, 1861, while at the 28th Infantry Regiment and to captain on July 14, 1866. He then participated in the Third Italian War of Independence and fought the Austrians at Borgosatollo and Levico. After the war, he returned to the 28th Infantry Regiment from 1874 to March 1878 and two months later, he was promoted to major. Around 1888, Airaghi was given command of the 77th Infantry Regiment and promoted to Colonel in October 1888. Around September 1889, Airaghi was sent to Eritrea and stationed at the Asmara–Keren area before being transferred to Massawa. In January 1890, he took part in an expedition to Ethiopia under the command of Baldassarre Orero before returning to the Italian mainland on October of the same year. He was then given command of the 36th Infantry Regiment but left on August 1, 1893, following a request to become a auxiliary.

Battle of Adwa

On January 13, 1896, Airaghi was called to Eritrea to participate at the First Italo-Ethiopian War as he commanded the 6th African Infantry Regiment as part of the 2nd Brigade of the Right column. On the evening of February 29, Airaghi began his march towards Adwa, reaching the Rebbi Arienni on March 1. During the Battle of Adwa, he conducted repeated assaults on the Ethiopian forces with enthusiasm and courage. Despite his success at keeping the Ethiopian forces back, they were beginning to outnumber Airaghi's regiment and they surrounded and he was killed in the fighting. Airaghi was posthumously awarded the Gold Medal of Military Valor on March 1, 1896, for his command at Adwa and a plaque was placed in Milan in memory.

References

1840 births
1896 deaths
Italian Army officers
Military personnel from Milan
People of former Italian colonies
University of Pavia alumni
Recipients of the Gold Medal of Military Valor
Italian military personnel of the First Italo-Ethiopian War
Italian military personnel killed in the First Italo-Ethiopian War